Paul Larson (Per-Åke Larson) is a computer scientist. He is most famous for inventing the linear hashing algorithm with Witold Litwin. Paul Larson is currently a senior researcher in the Database Group of Microsoft Research. He is frequent chair and committee member of conferences such as VLDB, SIGMOD, and ICDE.
In 2005 he was inducted as a Fellow of the Association for Computing Machinery.

References 

Larson PA. "Dynamic Hash Tables." Communications of the ACM. April 1988, 31(4):446-57 pdf.

External links 
Paul Larson MSR Page
UW MSR Summer Institute 2010

Year of birth missing (living people)
Living people
Microsoft employees
American computer scientists
Database researchers
Academic staff of the University of Waterloo
Fellows of the Association for Computing Machinery